Lobo is a fictional Western comic-book hero who is the medium's first African-American character to headline his own series.

Publication history
Lobo starred in Dell Comics' little-known, two-issue series Lobo (Dec. 1965 & Sept. 1966), also listed as Dell Comics #12-439-512 and #12-439-610 in the company's quirky numbering system. Created by Dell editor and writer Don "D. J." Arneson and artist Tony Tallarico, it chronicled the Old West adventures of a wealthy, unnamed African-American gunslinger called "Lobo" by the first issue's antagonists. On the foreheads of vanquished criminals, Lobo would leave the calling card of a gold coin imprinted with the images of a wolf and the letter "L".

Tallarico in a 2006 interview said that he and Arneson co-created the character based on an idea and a plot by Tallarico, with Arneson scripting it:

Arneson, in a 2010 interview, disputed this version of Lobo's creation:

Later appearances
Lobo was revived in 2017 in InDELLible Comics’ All-New Popular Comics #1.

In 2018, a Lobo novella was published in a collection entitled, Fantastic 4N1, written by author, David Noe.

Awards
In May 2006, Tallarico was bestowed the East Coast Black Age of Comics Convention's Pioneer Award for Lifetime Achievement, in recognition of his work on the first comic book to star an African-American. He was an honoree at the reception dinner at the African American Museum in Philadelphia, Pennsylvania.

Black comic book stars
Aside from characters featured in the single-issue, small-press niche publication All-Negro Comics in 1947, the first mainstream comic book feature with a black star, albeit not African-American, was "Waku, Prince of the Bantu", an African tribal chief feature from Marvel Comics' 1950s predecessor Atlas Comics. This was one of four regular features in each issue of the omnibus title Jungle Tales (Sept. 1954 – Sept. 1955). Marvel introduced the first black superhero, the Black Panther, also an African, as a supporting character in a 1966 issue of Fantastic Four. Comic books' first known African-American superhero, Marvel's the Falcon, debuted in Captain America #117 (Sept. 1969). There would be no Black star of his or her own comic until 1972, with Marvel's Luke Cage, Hero for Hire, followed in 1973 by Marvel's Black Panther in Jungle Action.

See also

 African characters in comics
List of African-American firsts

References

Comics characters introduced in 1965
Dell Comics characters
1965 comics debuts
African-Americans in comic strips
Fictional cowboys and cowgirls
Fictional marksmen and snipers
Male characters in comics